Sleeping Dogs (also known as Deviants and Mission: LA 2029) is a 1997 Canadian sci-fi action film directed by Michael Bafaro.

Plot
A jewel thief in 2020s Los Angeles (Scott McNeil) tries to save a spaceship crew from the emerald smuggling criminals who are holding them captive.

Cast
 Scott McNeil as Harry Maxwell
 C. Thomas Howell as Sanchez Boon
 Heather Hanson as Pandora Grimes
 Kiara Hunter as Zee 4R
 Richard Toth as Wallace
 Angela Madden as Stocker
 Stephen Fisher as Morton
 Sean Fuller as Sweeney
 Paul Jarrett as Willy Boy Pruitt
 Gregory Linington as Brock
 Christopher Clarke as Grogan
 Julius Krajewski as Samson
 Seth Markel as Crenshaw
 Michael Rogers as Haverty
 Darren Dalton as Dexter
 Jaroslav Peterka as Raoul
 Pavel Kříž as Alexandrov
 Dave Ulrich as Cole
 Shannon McCormick as Tippit
 Karel Vávrovec as Carlos
 Miroslav Lhotka as Hugo

Background
It was a Czech Republic co-production, with filming taking place in Czech studios. It is the only film to feature Australian-Canadian actor Scott McNeil in a leading role. McNeil is known for his extensive voice acting career, and at the time was voicing Piccolo in the Saban dub of Dragon Ball Z.

Release and reception
It was released direct-to-video in North America, Europe and Australia.

Robert Firsching of AllMovie gave the film two stars, writing "Set in the year 2029 for no apparent reason, this Canadian-Czech co-production literally consists of almost nothing but a steady barrage of gunfire and explosions. Reducing its genre (sci-fi/action) to nothing but the so-called 'good parts,' Sleeping Dogs (1997) emerges as a movie that looks like it was filmed in shorthand. It's a paint-by-numbers effort with very little to either praise or criticize; it's just there, although that's no reason for anyone to feel compelled to watch it." He also claimed that, "As the ludicrously named Sanchez Boon, C. Thomas Howell prances around and prissily quotes literature like a bearded Riddler from a particularly bad episode of the old Batman TV series. Howell's ridiculous performance is the sole reason that even those viewers who cherish bad movies would want to watch this."

TV Guide gave Sleeping Dogs a mixed negative review, labelling it as having "looney-tune characters, stale dialogue and the unmistakable whiff of cheesy camp." They claimed that, "nothing about this futuristic sci-fi adventure is exceptional or unexpected, except the extensive exposition involving gems replacing cash as currency."

References

External links

1990s science fiction action films
1997 films
1997 action films
Canadian science fiction action films
English-language Canadian films
Films set in Los Angeles
Films set in 2029
1990s English-language films
1990s Canadian films